Denis Cecil Howe (14 September 1928 – 7 June 2020) was an English footballer who made 223 appearances in the Football League for Darlington, Southend United and Aldershot in the 1950s. A full back or centre half, he also played in the Southern League for Bedford Town.

Life and career

Howe was born in September 1928 in West Ham, now part of London. He began his football career with West Ham United, but never played first-team football for the club, and moved on to Darlington in 1951. After three years and 89 appearances in the Third Division North, he spent four seasons in the Southern Section with Southend United, for whom he played 108 senior matches (101 in league competition). He finished his career in the Football League with a season at Aldershot in Division Four. Howe signed for Southern League club Bedford Town in 1959, and played regularly for his first season with the club, but injuries restricted his second season to just six senior matches, the last of which was on 3 November 1960.

He died in June 2020 at the age of 91.

References

1928 births
2020 deaths
Aldershot F.C. players
Association football defenders
Bedford Town F.C. players
Darlington F.C. players
English Football League players
English footballers
Footballers from West Ham
Southend United F.C. players
Southern Football League players
West Ham United F.C. players